Éric Dubois (born May 10, 1970) is a Canadian former professional ice hockey player who played over 500 career games in the American Hockey League (AHL), International Hockey League (IHL) and the Deutsche Eishockey Liga (DEL). He is currently an assistant coach with the Manitoba Moose of the AHL.

Playing career
Dubois played his entire junior career with the Laval Titan of the Quebec Major Junior Hockey League (QMJHL) from 1986 to 1991, during which the Titan captured two league titles (1988–89 and 1990–91). Over five full seasons, he amassed 222 points in 321 regular season games and earned QMJHL First Team All-Star honours in 1988–89.

After being drafted by the Quebec Nordiques of the National Hockey League (NHL) in the fourth round of the 1989 Entry Draft, Dubois went on to play seven seasons in the minor leagues from 1991 to 1997, primarily with the IHL's Atlanta Knights, Chicago Wolves, and Manitoba Moose.  This included a Turner Cup championship with the Knights in 1994. He also played another five seasons in Europe, including three in the DEL and two more in British Ice Hockey Superleague.  He retired from full-time professional hockey in 2002, but played one season for the semi-professional Sorel Royaux before retiring for good.

Coaching career
After the end of his playing career, Dubois spent eleven seasons coaching in the QMJHL, including five full seasons as a head coach, with the Baie-Comeau Drakkar, Acadie-Bathurst Titan, and Rimouski Oceanic.  He was hired as an assistant coach by the Manitoba Moose, now the AHL affiliate of the NHL's Winnipeg Jets, prior to the 2016–17 season.

Personal life
Dubois and his wife, Jill, currently make their home in Winnipeg, Manitoba. They have two children, one of whom is Winnipeg Jets player Pierre-Luc Dubois.

Career statistics

Regular season and playoffs

Awards and honours

References

External links

1970 births
Living people
Acadie–Bathurst Titan coaches
Atlanta Knights players
Baie-Comeau Drakkar coaches
Canadian ice hockey defencemen
Canadian expatriate ice hockey players in England
Canadian expatriate ice hockey players in Germany
Chicago Wolves (IHL) players
Greensboro Monarchs players
Halifax Citadels players
Ice hockey people from New Brunswick
Laval Titan players
Manitoba Moose coaches
Manitoba Moose (IHL) players
Newcastle Riverkings players
New Haven Nighthawks players
Nottingham Panthers players
Oklahoma City Blazers (1992–2009) players
Quebec Nordiques draft picks
Revier Löwen players
Rimouski Océanic coaches
Schwenninger Wild Wings players
Sportspeople from Moncton